This is a list of ambassadors of the United States to Ivory Coast, also known as Côte d'Ivoire.

August 1960 – October 1960: Donald R. Norland (ad Interim)
20 November 1960 – 12 May 1962: R. Borden Reams (Ambassador)
27 November 1962 – 6 March 1965: James Wine (Ambassador)
5 August 1965 – 16 November 1969: George A. Morgan (Ambassador)
23 December 1969 – 6 March 1974: John F. Root (Ambassador)
11 April 1974 – 8 August 1976: Robert Solwin Smith (Ambassador)
13 November 1976 – 12 July 1979: Monteagle Stearns (Ambassador)
16 January 1980 – 16 August 1983: Nancy V. Rawls (Ambassador)
18 November 1983 – 3 August 1986: Robert H. Miller (Ambassador)
2 December 1986 – 8 October 1989: Dennis Kux (Ambassador)
22 November 1989 – 3 July 1992: Kenneth L. Brown (Ambassador)
10 September 1992 – 6 July 1995: Hume Alexander Horan (Ambassador)
6 October 1995 – 28 September 1998: Lannon Walker (Ambassador)
6 January 1999 – 12 July 2001: George Mu (Ambassador)
19 December 2001 – 23 July 2004: Arlene Render (Ambassador)
6 August 2004 – August 2007:  Aubrey Hooks (Ambassador)
25 September 2007 – 10 August 2010:  Wanda Nesbitt (Ambassador)
23 August 2010 – 27 August 2013:Phillip Carter III (Ambassador)
21 November 2013 – August 2016:Terence McCulley (Ambassador)
August 2016 – August 2017:Andrew Haviland (Chargé d'Affaires)
August 2017 – September 2019:Katherine Brucker (Chargé d'Affaires)
10 October 2019 – 31 January 2023: Richard K. Bell (Ambassador)
 2 March 2023: Jessica Davis Ba (Ambassador)

See also
Ivory Coast – United States relations
Foreign relations of Ivory Coast
Ambassadors of the United States

References

United States Department of State: Background notes on Côte d'Ivoire

External links
United States Department of State: Chiefs of Mission for Côte d'Ivoire
United States Department of State: Côte d'Ivoire
United States Embassy in Cote d'Ivoire

Cote divoire

United Kingdom